The Geometer's Sketchpad is a commercial interactive geometry software program for exploring Euclidean geometry, algebra, calculus, and other areas of mathematics. It was created as part of the NSF-funded Visual Geometry Project led by Eugene Klotz and Doris Schattschneider from 1986 to 1991 at  Swarthmore College.  Nicholas Jackiw, a student at the time, was the original designer and programmer of the software, and inventor of its trademarked "Dynamic Geometry" approach; he later moved to Key Curriculum Press, KCP Technologies, and McGraw-Hill Education to continue ongoing design and implementation of the software over multiple major releases and hardware platforms. Present versions run Microsoft Windows and Mac OS 8. It also runs on Linux under Wine with a few bugs. There was also a version developed for the TI-89 and TI-92 series of Calculators. In June 2019 McGraw-Hill announced they will no longer sell new licenses. Nonetheless, a new (2021) 64-bit version of Mac Sketchpad that is compatible with the new Apple M1 silicon chips is available as part of an ongoing beta test.

Features
The Geometer's Sketchpad includes the traditional Euclidean tools of classical geometric constructions. It also can perform transformations (translations, rotations, reflections, dilations) of geometric figures drawn or constructed on screen. It is far more than a construction or transformation tool, however.   It can manipulate constructed objects "dynamically" by stretching or dragging while maintaining all constraints of the construction so that a seemingly infinite number of cases of a constructed figure can be viewed.  Thus it is a natural tool for making or testing conjectures about geometric figures.  Its accurate drawings of geometric figures make it a useful tool for illustrating mathematical articles for publication. If a figure (such as the pentadecagon) can be constructed with the compass and straightedge method, it can also be constructed in the program. The program allows "cheat" transformations to create figures impossible to construct under the compass and straightedge rules (such as the regular nonagon). Objects can be animated.

The program allows the creation of numerous objects which can be measured, and potentially used to solve hard math problems. The program allows the determination of the midpoints and midsegments of objects. The Geometer's Sketchpad can measure lengths of segments, measures of angles, area, perimeter, etc. Some of the tools include a construct function, which allows the user to create objects in relation to selected objects. The transform function allows the user to create points in relation to objects, which include distance, angle, ratio, and others.

Web Sketchpad
Built on the foundation of The Geometer's Sketchpad, Web Sketchpad (WSP) began as part of the NSF DRK-12 funded Dynamic Number project. WSP removes distracting interfaces—it has no menus, displays no dialog boxes, and does not require users to “select” objects to apply commands to them. Three noteworthy characteristics of Web Sketchpad's tools are the following:

Web Sketchpad's tools are immediately visible. When a user taps a tool icon, all the objects produced by the tool are immediately visible, foregrounded in the sketch and awaiting the user's decision as to how to integrate these objects into the sketch. In contrast, other dynamic mathematics software often leaves students unable to predict the effects of their next action.

Web Sketchpad's tools are targeted. Activities include only those tools necessary for the task at hand, reducing software complexity. A focused set of tools also the activity designer to create instrumented fields of promoted action where the presence of particular tools encourages teachers and students to adopt these tools as frames of action and reference, channeling them to think about problems in ways they otherwise might not.

Web Sketchpad's tools are customizable. The set of WSP tools is theoretically unlimited. A teacher can craft new tools based on the mathematical and pedagogical needs of a lesson without the traditional limits of a fixed set of generic tools.

See also
 List of interactive geometry software
 Lénárt sphere

References

Further reading
Kimberling, Clark. Geometry in Action: A Discovery Approach Using The Geometer's Sketchpad.  Key College Publishing, Emeryville, California, (2003), .

External links
 
Sketchpad Repository 
Web Sketchpad

Interactive geometry software